PC World's Digital Duo was a computer themed US television series that aired on PBS stations in 1999 as Digital Duo for 26 episodes and returned to broadcast as PC World's Digital Duo with an additional 26 episodes in 2005.  It ran for a half-hour per episode and was produced by Incandescent Entertainment.  It featured co-hosts Stephen Manes of Forbes & PC World with Angela Gunn of USAToday.com in a "Siskel & Ebert" style format in which they would rate computer and on-line products and services.  Each episode would also feature a commentary segment by Walt Mossberg.

Episodes

References

External links

 Official site
 Digital Duo at Incandescent Entertainment
 Up Front: Now on TV, PC World's Digital Duo

American non-fiction television series
PBS original programming
1990s American television series
2000s American television series